Gijs Broeksma is a Dutch archer. He competes in recurve archery and is right-handed. 

He competed in Archery at the 2020 Summer Olympics where he as a part of Dutch team reached fourth place together with his teammates Sjef van den Berg en Steve Wijler. In the individual tournament he reached 14th place in qualifications. Broeksma won in the knock-out phase and the 32nd finals but eventually lost in 16th finals after a shoot-off with 6-5 from de Takaharu Furukawa of Japan. 

Broeksma was raised in Ruinen, Netherlands and currently lives in Arnhem where he trains at National Sports Centre Papendal.

External links 
 Profile World Archery
 Sporter profile on Olympics.com 
 World Archery athlete profile
 Personal Instagram

References

Living people
1999 births
Dutch male archers
Archers at the 2020 Summer Olympics
Olympic archers of the Netherlands
20th-century Dutch people
21st-century Dutch people